Willy Lott's Cottage is a house in Flatford, East Bergholt, Suffolk, England which appears in several paintings by John Constable, notably The Hay Wain. 

The property is Grade I listed to reflect its importance "as part of the Flatford Mill group" and "its significance in the work of the artist John Constable".

The earliest part of the building is sixteenth century. It was restored in the 1920s after a revival of interest in Constable's paintings. It has been renamed Willy Lott's House because this is the name Constable used in his paintings. It is owned by the National Trust.

The cottage is located on the bank of the River Stour, just downstream from Flatford Mill in the heart of Dedham Vale, a typically English rural landscape. Flatford Mill, along with neighbouring Valley Farm and Bridge Cottage, are leased to the Field Studies Council, which uses them as locations for arts-based courses such as painting, and as accommodation for science-based courses such as residential ecology trips for students up to A-level.

William Lott 
The cottage takes its name from its resident at the time John Constable did his paintings; at that time, the house was known as  Gibeons Farm.  William Lott (1761–1849), a tenant farmer,  resided at Gibeons Farm and spent only four nights away from this house in the whole of his life. He is buried at St Mary the Virgin Churchyard in East Bergholt.

According to a 2020 article, "Willy Lott himself became famous thanks to Constable, but only after his death". The cottage was purchased in 1926 by Thomas Parkington; after his death, the National Trust purchased it from his estate.

References

External links

National Trust - Willy Lott's House
Constable's England, a full text exhibition catalog from The Metropolitan Museum of Art, which contains material on Willy Lott's Cottage

Grade I listed buildings in Suffolk
Grade I listed houses
Houses in Suffolk
National Trust properties in Suffolk
Timber framed buildings in Suffolk
East Bergholt
Cottages